Low Nunatak is a nunatak in the Cotton Glacier,  north of the western end of Killer Ridge, in the Gonville and Caius Range of Victoria Land. The descriptive name appears on the map of the British Antarctic Expedition of 1910–1913.

References

Nunataks of Victoria Land